A referendum on continued membership of the Federation of the West Indies was held in Jamaica on 19 September 1961. Voters were asked "Should Jamaica remain in the Federation of the West Indies?" The result was 54.1% voting "no", resulting in the country leaving the federation and its dissolution in 1962. Voter turnout was 61.5%.

Results

Sources
West Indies Federal Archives Centre: File FWI-PM-GA-37: Holding of Referendum in Jamaica.
West Indies Federal Archives Centre: File FWI-PM-GA-27: Situation Arising from Jamaica Referendum: Report by Professor Lewis - 9 Nov 1961 - 14 Jan 1962.

References

1961 in Jamaica
Referendums in Jamaica 
1961 referendums
West Indies Federation
Jamaica–United Kingdom relations
Separatism in North America